The Henry Allen House is a historic house located in the village of Moravia, Cayuga County, New York.

Description and history 

It is a two-story, frame residence constructed in the Italianate style. The house was built in about 1877.

It was listed on the National Register of Historic Places on February 24, 1995.

References

External links

Houses on the National Register of Historic Places in New York (state)
Italianate architecture in New York (state)
Houses completed in 1877
Houses in Cayuga County, New York
Moravia (village), New York
National Register of Historic Places in Cayuga County, New York
1877 establishments in New York (state)